The 1978–79 Scottish First Division season was won by Dundee, who were promoted along with Kilmarnock to  the Premier Division. Montrose and Queen of the South were relegated to the Second Division.

Table

References

Scottish First Division seasons
2
Scot